The National Prize for Arts and Sciences is awarded annually by the Government of Mexico in six categories. It is part of the Mexican Honours System and was established in 1945. The prize is a gold medal and 520,000 pesos.

Selected winners
For a complete list of winners in tabular format, see the corresponding article in Spanish.

Linguistics and literature
Lingüística y Literatura

1935: Gregorio López y Fuentes
1946: Alfonso Reyes
1949: Mariano Azuela González 
1958: Martín Luis Guzmán 
1964: Carlos Pellicer Cámara 
1965: Ángel María Garibay 
1966: Jaime Torres Bodet 
1967: Salvador Novo López 
1968: José Gorostiza
1969: Silvio Zavala Vallado
1970: Juan Rulfo
1971: Daniel Cosío Villegas
1972: Rodolfo Usigli
1973: Agustín Yáñez
1974: Rubén Bonifaz Nuño
1975: Francisco Monterde
1976: 
 Antonio Gómez Robledo
 Efraín Huerta
1977: Octavio Paz
1978: Fernando Benítez
1979: Juan José Arreola
1980: José Luis Martínez Rodríguez
1981: Mauricio Magdaleno
1982: Elías Nandino
1983: Jaime Sabines
1984: Carlos Fuentes Macías
1985: Marco Antonio Montes de Oca
1986: Rafael Solana
1987: Alí Chumacero
1988: Eduardo Lizalde
1993: Sergio Pitol 
1995: Juan Miguel Lope Blanch
2000: Margit Frenk
2001: Vicente Leñero
2002: Elena Poniatowska
2004: Margo Glantz
2005: Carlos Monsiváis
2010: Maruxa Vilalta
2011: Daniel Sada
2013:
Hugo Gutiérrez Vega
Luis Fernando Lara Ramos
2014:
Dolores Castro
Eraclio Zepeda
2015:
David Huerta
Felipe Garrido
Yolanda Lastra
2016:Elsa María Cross y Anzaldúa
2017:Alberto Ruy Sánchez
2018:Angelina Muñiz-Huberman
2019:Concepción Company
2020: Jesús Adolfo Castañón Morán

Physics, Mathematics, and Natural Sciences
Ciencias Físico-Matemáticas y Naturales

1948: Maximiliano Ruiz Castañeda
1957: Nabor Carrillo Flores
1959: Manuel Sandoval Vallarta
1961: Ignacio Chávez Sánchez
1963: Guillermo Haro Barraza
1964: Ignacio González Guzmán
1966: Arturo Rosenblueth Stearns
1967: José Adem Chaín
1968: Salvador Zubirán Anchondo
1969: 
 Fernando de Alba Andrade
 Ignacio Bernal
1970: Carlos Graef Fernández
1971: Jesús Romo Armería
1972: 
 Antonio González Ochoa
 Isaac Costero Tudanca
 Luis Sánchez Medal
1973: Carlos Casas Campillo
1974: 
 Emilio Rosenblueth Deutsch
 Ruy Pérez Tamayo
1975:
 Arcadio Poveda Ricalde
 Guillermo Massieu
 Joaquín Gravioto
1976: 
 Ismael Herrera Revilla
 Julían Adem Chahín
 Samuel Gitler Hammer
1977: Jorge Cerbón Solórzano
1978: Rafael Méndez Martínez
1979: Pablo Rudomín Zevnovaty
1980: Guillermo Soberón Acevedo
1981: Manuel Peimbert Sierra
1982: Bernardo Sepúlveda Gutiérrez
1983: Octavio Augusto Novaro
1984: José Ruiz Herrera
1985: Marcos Rojkind Matlyuk
1986: Adolfo Martínez Palomo
2002: Luis de la Peña
2006: Juan Ramón de la Fuente
2007: Silvia Torres Castilleja
2008:
Edmundo García Moya
Alberto Robledo Nieto
Moisés Selman
2009:
Alberto Darszon Israel
Jaime Urrutia Fucugauchi
2010:
Marcelo Lozada y Cassou
Gerardo Gamba Ayala
2011:Julio Collado-Vides
2012:
Ruben Gerardo Barrera
Carlos Artemio Coello Coello
Susana Lizano
2013:
Federico Bermúdez Rattoni
Magdaleno Medina Noyola
2014:
Carlos Federico Arias Ortiz
Mauricio Hernández Ávila
2015:
Jorge Alcocer Varela
Fernando del Río Haza
2016:
Cecilia Noguez
David Kershenobich Stalnikowitz
2017:María Elena Álvarez-Buylla Roces
2018:
Carlos Alberto Aguilar Salinas
Mónica Alicia Clapp Jiménez Labora

Technology and Design
Tecnología y Diseño

1976:
 Reinaldo Pérez Rayón
 Wenceslao X. López Martín del Campo
1977: Francisco Rafael del Valle Canseco
1978: Enrique del Moral
1979: Juan Celada Salmón
1980: Marcos Mazari Menzer
1981: Luis Esteva Maraboto
1982: Raúl J. Marsal Córdoba
1983: José Antonio Ruiz de la Herrán Villagómez
1984: Jorge Suárez Díaz
1985: José Luis Sánchez Bribiesca
1986: Daniel Malacara Hernández
1987: Enrique Hong Chong
1988: Mayra de la Torre
1990:
 Daniel Reséndiz Núñez
 Juan Milton Garduño
1991:
 Octavio Paredes López
 Roberto Meli Piralla
1992:
 Lorenzo Martínez Gómez 
 Gabriel Torres Villaseñor
1993: José Ricardo Gómez Romero
1994:
 Francisco Sánchez Sesma
 Juan Vázquez Lomberta
1995: Alfredo Sánchez Marroquín
1996:
 Adolfo Guzmán Arenas
 María Luisa Ortega Delgado
1997:
 Baltasar Mena Iniesta
 Feliciano Sánchez Silencio
1999: Jesús Gonzales Hernández
2000: Francisco Alfonso Larque Saavedra
2001: Filberto Vázquez Dávila
2002: Alexander Balankin
2003: Octavio Manero Brito
2004:
Héctor Mario Gómez Galvarriata
Martín Guillermo Hernández Luna
Arturo Menchaca
2005: Alejandro Alagón Cano
2006: Fernando Samaniego Verduzco
2007: Miguel Pedro Romo Organista
2008: María de los Ángeles Valdés
2009:
Blanca Elena Jiménez Cisneros
José Luis Leyva Montiel
2010: Sergio Revah Moiseev
2011: Raúl Gerardo Quintero Flores
2012: Sergio Antonio Estrada Parra
2013: Martín Ramón Aluja Schuneman Hofer
2014: José Mauricio López Romero
2015:
Raúl Rojas
Enrique Galindo Fentanes
2016:
Lourival Possani Postay
Luis Enrique Sucar Succar
2017:Emilio Sacristan Rock
2018:
Ricardo Chicurel Uziel
Leticia Myriam Torres Guerra

Popular Arts and Traditions
Artes y Tradiciones Populares

 1984: Artesanos de Santa Clara del Cobre
 1985:
 Banda Infantil del centro de Capacitación Musical de la región Mixe
 Grupo de teñidores mixtecos del caracol púrpura panza, Pinotepa Nacional
 1986:
 Grupo de danza regional Chichimeca de Querétaro
 Sociedad de artesanos indígenas Sna Jolobil
 1989: Consuelo Velázquez
 1990:  Pedro Linares López
 1998: Band Tlayacapan
2013: Narciso Lico Carrillo
 2014:
 Carlomagno Pedro Martínez
 Alberto Vargas Castellano
 2015: Los Folkloristas and Victorina López Hilario
 2016: Manuela Cecilia Lino Bello
 2017: Francisco Barnett Astorga
 2018: Leonor Farlow Espinoza
2019: Carmen Vázquez Hernández
2020: Mario Agustín Gaspar Rodríguez

Fine arts
Bellas Artes

1981: José Luis Cuevas
1982: 
 Abraham Zabludovsky
 Teodoro González de León
1983: Manuel Enríquez
1984: Pedro Coronel
1985: Alberto Beltrán García
1986: Mario Pani
1987: Juan Soriano
1988: Manuel Felguérez Aspe
1989: Ignacio Díaz Morales
1990: Olga Costa
1991: 
 Mario Lavista
 Ricardo Legorreta Vilchis
 Vicente Rojo Almazán
1992:
 Amalia Hernández Navarro
 José Jesús Francisco Zúñiga Chavarría
 Manuel de Elías Mondragón
1993: Carlos Jiménez Mabarak
1994: Héctor Mendoza Franco
1995: Federico Silva
1996: Luis Nishizawa
1997: Arturo Ripstein
1998: Francisco Toledo
1999: Guillermo Arriaga Fernández
2000: José Raúl Anguiano Valadez
2001:
 José Alejandro Dionisio Luna Ledesma
 Alfredo Zalce Torres
 Federico Ibarra Groth
2002: Héctor Cobo
2003:
 Gilberto Horacio Aceves Navarro
 J. Francisco Serrano Cacho
 Ludwik Margules Coben
2004: Juan José Gurrola
2005: Leonora Carrington
2009:
 Helen Escobedo
 Arturo Márquez
2010:
Luis López Loza
Marta Palau Bosch
2011:
Pedro Cervantes
Jorge Fons
2012:
Arón Claudio Bitrán Goren
Fernando González Gortázar
Helene Joy Laville Perren
Fernando González Gortázar
2013:
Javier Álvarez (composer)
Ángela Gurría
Paul Leduc (film director)
2014: Arnaldo José Coen Ávila
2015:
 Sebastián (sculptor)
 Ignacio López Tarso
 Fernando López Carmona
2016: Gabriela Ortiz Torres
2017: Nicolás Echevarría
2018: 
Ricardo Chicurel Uziel
Leticia Myriam Torres Guerra
2019: Abraham Oceransky
2020: Alfredo Federico López Austin

History, Social Sciences, and Philosophy
Historia, Ciencias Sociales y Filosofía

1960: Alfonso Caso
1962: Jesús Silva Herzog
1976: Eduardo García Máynez
1977: Víctor L. Urquidi Bingham
1978: Mario de la Cueva
1979: Gonzalo Aguirre Beltrán
1980: Leopoldo Zea Aguilar
1981: Miguel León-Portilla
1982: Héctor Fix Zamudio
1983: Luis González y González
1984: Pablo González Casanova
1985: Alfonso Noriega Cantú
1986: Luis Villoro Toranzo
1997: Rodolfo Stavenhagen
2001: Ida Rodríguez Prampolini
2002: Adolfo Sánchez Vázquez
2007:
 Pilar Gonzalbo Aizpuru
 Eduardo Matos Moctezuma
2008: 
Jaime Labastida
Álvaro Matute Aguirre
Margarita Nolasco Armas
2009: 
 Enrique de la Garza Toledo
 José Ramón Cossío
2010:
 Enrique Krauze
 Soledad Loaeza
2011:
 Jean Meyer
 Lorenzo Meyer
2012:
 Carlos Marichal
 Carlos Muñoz Izquierdo
2013:
 Roger Bartra
 Carlos Martínez Assad
2014:
 Néstor García Canclini
 Enrique Semo
2015: Antonio Armando García de León Griego
2016: Aurelio de los Reyes
2017: Mercedes de la Garza Camino
2018: Salomón Nahmad y Sittón
2019: Diego Valadés
2020: Manuel de Jesús Hernández

Special award
In a controversial move, in 2020 Bertha Cecilia Navarro y Solares, movie producer, was awarded an ″extraordinary distinction.″

See also

Premio México de Ciencia y Tecnología
History of science and technology in Mexico

References

External links
 Prize rules (2006), Secretaría de Educación Pública

 
Mexican awards